Gotham Group is an American diversified management and production company in the entertainment industry. Goldsmith-Vein and her company have produced such projects as The Spiderwick Chronicles and The Maze Runner franchise. The company was founded by Ellen Goldsmith-Vein in 1994.

Filmography

Films

Television

References

External links 
 Official website

Companies based in California